Juan José Parra Barrientos (born 6 May 2001) is a Colombian professional footballer who plays as a defender for Categoría Primera A club Independiente Medellín.

Career
Born in Medellín, Parra began his career with the local club Independiente Medellín, rising up the youth ranks. He made his professional debut for the club on 22 October 2020 in the Copa Libertadores against Libertad, coming on as a 73rd minute substitute during the 4–2 victory.

North Texas SC (loan)
On 8 February 2021, Parra joined USL League One club North Texas SC, the reserve club of Major League Soccer club FC Dallas, on loan for the 2021 season. He made his debut for the club on 1 May 2021 against Greenville Triumph, coming on as a halftime substitute in a 0–4 defeat. On 20 July 2021, North Texas and Parra mutually agreed to terminate his loan early.

Career statistics

References

External links
 Profile at FC Dallas

2001 births
Living people
Sportspeople from Medellín
Colombian footballers
Association football defenders
Independiente Medellín footballers
North Texas SC players
Categoría Primera A players
USL League One players
Colombian expatriate footballers
Expatriate soccer players in the United States
21st-century Colombian people